The 1936 United States presidential election in Maryland took place on November 3, 1936, as part of the 1936 United States presidential election. State voters chose eight representatives, or electors, to the Electoral College, who voted for president and vice president.

Maryland was won by incumbent President Franklin D. Roosevelt (D–New York), running with Vice President John Nance Garner, with 62.35% of the popular vote, against Governor Alf Landon (R–Kansas), running with Frank Knox, with 37.04% of the popular vote.

Maryland weighed in for this election as Roosevelt’s strongest performance in any of the border states.

Results

Results by county

Counties that flipped from Democratic to Republican
Carroll
Charles
Somerset

See also
 United States presidential elections in Maryland
 1936 United States presidential election
 1936 United States elections

Notes

References 

Maryland
1936
Presidential